Gharib Mazraeh (also Romanized as Gharīb Mazra‘eh and Qarīb Mazra‘eh) is a village in Kuhpayeh-e Gharbi Rural District, in the Central District of Abyek County, Qazvin Province, Iran. At the 2006 census, its population was 76, in 28 families.

References 

Populated places in Abyek County